Wharton Basin is the marine area of the north east quarter of the Indian Ocean. It is named after William Wharton (1843-1905), Hydrographer of the Navy. Alternative names are Cocos Basin (after the Cocos Islands) and West Australian Basin.

It lies east of the Ninety East Ridge and west of Western Australia.

It is of interest in relation to Indian Ocean floor movement and adjacent Fracture zones  and the relationship between the Indian and Australian plates  and is one of a number of features of the Indian Ocean that has been studied extensively. However, its floor has not been charted since the 1960s and is not well known.

References

External links

Oceanic basins of the Indian Ocean